Stanisław Andrzejewski (27 December 1916 – 10 January 1997) was a Polish footballer. He played in one match for the Poland national football team in 1936.

References

External links
 

1916 births
1997 deaths
Polish footballers
Poland international footballers
Place of birth missing
Association football goalkeepers
ŁKS Łódź players